David Lee Carpenter (born September 1, 1987) is an American former professional baseball pitcher. He has played for the  Los Angeles Angels of Anaheim and Atlanta Braves.

Professional career
Carpenter throws four pitches: a four-seam fastball and two-seam fastball 85–88 mph, a changeup and slider that average about 80 mph.

Los Angeles Angels of Anaheim
Carpenter was called up to the majors for the first time on April 13, 2012. He was outrighted off the Angels roster on September 22, 2013. He was called up on June 21, 2014 and designated for assignment on August 2. He was assigned outright to the Triple-A Salt Lake Bees on August 5. Carpenter elected free agency in October 2014.

Atlanta Braves
He signed with the Braves in January 2015. He was called up on July 6 by the Braves. He became a free agent on October 6, 2016.

References

External links

New Mexico Lobos bio

1987 births
Living people
Baseball players from Arlington, Texas
Major League Baseball pitchers
Los Angeles Angels players
Atlanta Braves players
New Mexico Lobos baseball players
NMJC Thunderbirds baseball players
Paris Dragons baseball players
Orem Owlz players
Cedar Rapids Kernels players
Inland Empire 66ers of San Bernardino players
Arkansas Travelers players
Scottsdale Scorpions players
Salt Lake Bees players
Gwinnett Braves players